Minusu Buba (born September 8, 1985) is a Nigerian football striker who plays for Iraq Division One club Al-Sinaa.

Career
Minusu scored 6 goals  for Asmant Assiut in the 2005–06 Egyptian Premier League season.

Buba joined Ittihad El-Shorta (a.k.a. Police Union) in January 2009 from ENPPI. He enjoyed an extremely successful season with his new team in 2009–10. Buba scored 14 league goals that season and was crowned the league top scorer.

Honors

Clubs
Al-Shorta
 Iraqi Premier League: 2012–13

Individual
Egyptian Premier League Top Scorer: 2009–10

References

External links
 

1984 births
Living people
Nigerian footballers
Association football forwards
Nigerian expatriate sportspeople in Egypt
Nigerian expatriate footballers
Expatriate footballers in Egypt
Ittihad El Shorta SC players
Al-Shorta SC players
Egyptian Premier League players